Mixery is an EP by the German hard rock band Pink Cream 69 containing rare, live, acoustic and re-recorded tracks.

Track listing

Album notes 
 "King of My World" recorded during the sessions for Sonic Dynamite.
 "Shame" & "Break the Silence" were recorded live at Club Citta, Kawasaki, Japan on 6 March 1999. They are raw live versions, recorded by a bootlegger and taken away from him by security.
 "Looks That Kill" was originally recorded for the Mötley Crüe Tribute Sampler "Kickstart My Heart".

Personnel 
 David Readman – vocals
 Alfred Koffler – guitar
 Dennis Ward – bass
 Kosta Zafiriou – drums

Guest musicians 
 Günter Werno – keyboards ("Seas of Madness")

Pink Cream 69 albums
2000 albums
Massacre Records EPs
Albums produced by Dennis Ward (musician)

pt:Pink Cream 69 (álbum)